The Golden Eagle Award for Best Foreign Language Film is one of twenty award categories presented annually by the National Academy of Motion Pictures Arts and Sciences of Russia. It is one of the Golden Eagle Awards, which were established by Nikita Mikhalkov as a counterweight to the annual Nika Awards given by the Russian Academy of Cinema Arts and Sciences. It is the only category of the Golden Eagle Award that honors non-Russian-language films.

Each year, three nominees are selected by the academy. Though infrequent, there have been occasions when all three nominees came from the same country; this happened in 2008 and 2010, when all the films were from the United States. In 2002, the first recipient of the award was Amélie. The most recent award was given in 2021 to 1917. The nation with the most cumulative nominations is the United States, with 38 of the 57 nominations and 13 of the 19 wins to date. Other nations with multiple nominations are United Kingdom (with twelve), France (with nine), Germany and Spain (with four) and China (with fhree).

Nominations and awards
Key

A : (Titles in brackets are transliterated)

References

External links
 

Foreign Language Film
Lists of films by award
Golden Eagle Awards